A content management system (CMS) is computer software used to manage the creation and modification of digital content (content management).
A CMS is typically used for enterprise content management (ECM) and web content management (WCM).

ECM typically supports multiple users in a collaborative environment by integrating document management, digital asset management, and record retention.

Alternatively, WCM is the collaborative authoring for websites and may include text and embed graphics, photos, video, audio, maps, and program code that display content and interact with the user. ECM typically includes a WCM function.

Structure 

A CMS typically has two major components: a content management application (CMA), as the front-end user interface that allows a user, even with limited expertise, to add, modify, and remove content from a website without the intervention of a webmaster; and a content delivery application (CDA), that compiles the content and updates the website.

Installation type 
There are two types of CMS installation: on-premises and cloud-based. On-premises installation means that the CMS software can be installed on the server. This approach is usually taken by businesses that want flexibility in their setup. Notable CMSs which can be installed on-premises are Wordpress.org, Drupal, Joomla, ModX and others. 

The cloud-based CMS is hosted on the vendor environment. With this approach, the CMS software cannot be modified for the customer. Examples of notable cloud-based CMSs are SquareSpace, Contentful, Wordpress.com, Webflow, Ghost and WIX.

Common features 
The core CMS features are: indexing, search and retrieval, format management, revision control, and management.

Features may vary depending on the system application but will typically include:

 Intuitive indexing, search, and retrieval features index all data for easy access through search functions and allow users to search by attributes such as publication dates, keywords or author.
 Format management facilitates turning scanned paper documents and legacy electronic documents into HTML or PDF documents.
 Revision features allow content to be updated and edited after initial publication. Revision control also tracks any changes made to files by individuals.
 Publishing functionality allows individuals to use a template or a set of templates approved by the organization, as well as wizards and other tools to create or modify content.

Popular additional features may include:

  SEO-friendly URLs
 Integrated and online help, including  discussion boards
 Group-based permission systems
 Full template support and customizable templates
 Easy wizard-based install and versioning procedures
 Admin panel with multiple language support
 Content hierarchy with unlimited depth and size
 Minimal server requirements
 Integrated file managers
 Integrated audit logs
 Support AMP page for Google
 Support schema markup
 Designed as per Google quality guidelines for website architecture
 Availability of plug-ins for additional functionalities.
 Security precautions such as 2 Factor Authentication

Other types of content management systems 

Digital asset management systems are another type of CMS. They manage content with clearly-defined author or ownership, such as documents, movies, pictures, phone numbers, and scientific data. Companies also use CMSs to store, control, revise, and publish documentation.

There are also component content management systems (CCMS), which are CMSs that manage content at a modular level rather than as pages or articles. CCMSs are often used in technical communication, where many publications reuse the same content.

Widely Used CMSs 

Based on a survey, the most widely used content management system is WordPress, used by 42.8% of the top 10 million websites as of October 2021. (although, per definition, it is a blog system/website generator, not a fully-fledged content management system), followed by Shopify and Joomla.

See also 

 List of content management systems
 Content management
 Content Management Interface
 Document management system
 Dynamic web page
 Enterprise content management
 Headless content management system
 HTML
 Information management
 Knowledge management
 LAMP (software bundle)
 Revision control
 Web application framework
 Web content management system 
 Personalization management system

References

Bibliography

External links

 

 
Information systems
Website management
Records management
Records management technology